The France men's national under-18 and under-19 basketball team is the junior national basketball team representing France in international under-18 and under-19 competitions. It is administrated by the French Federation of Basketball (Fédération Française de Basket-Ball).

FIBA U18 European Championship participations

FIBA Under-19 Basketball World Cup participations

See also
 France men's national basketball team
 France women's national under-19 basketball team
 France men's national under-17 basketball team
 France men's national 3x3 team

References

External links
 Official website
 Archived records of France team participations

U
Men's national under-19 basketball teams
Basketball U